The Curb Agajanian Performance Group is an American motorsports team, currently competing as a co-entrant in IndyCar and IMSA. It is owned by record executive Mike Curb and racing personality Cary Agajanian; son of the late J. C. Agajanian, a race promoter and race car owner. It has fielded an IndyCar entry or co-entry in various races since 2001. Curb also was involved with NASCAR in both the Xfinity Series and Sprint Cup Series, owning Curb Racing from 1984 to 2011. Curb had several business partners in the NASCAR operation over the years, including Agajanian from 1998 to 2006.

CAPG has won two Indianapolis 500 races as a co-owner, in 2011 with Dan Wheldon, and in 2016 with Alexander Rossi.

History

For the 2001 season, the team partnered with Beck Motorsports and returned to full-time competition with veteran driver Billy Boat. Boat finished 2nd at Nashville Superspeedway and finished 4th in points.

Boat went on to form Agajanian/Boat Racing with Cary Agajanian in 2002 and captured the pole at Nashville and finished 13th in points. In 2003 Agajanian joined forces with Sam Schmidt Motorsports at the Indy 500 to field a car for Richie Hearn who was knocked out by an accident.

In 2004 CURB/Agajanian/Beck Motorsports came into being and P. J. Jones drove their entry in the Indy 500 to a 28th place DNF. In 2005, the team fielded a last-minute Indy 500 entry for rookie Arie Luyendyk Jr., however the car never handled properly and Luyendyk's best speed was easily bumped by Felipe Giaffone, leaving Luyendyk and the C/A/B team the only entry bumped from the field that year.

The team merged with Team Leader Motorsports to field 2 cars for the 2006 Indianapolis 500. The first team with driver P. J. Jones was Beck Motorsports owned by Greg Beck which was founded in 1995. The second team driven by Stephan Gregoire was owned by Kent Baker which was founded in 1988. Both Baker and Beck had many years experience working with their own and various other Indy Car teams. They were joined by Cary Agajanian and Mike Curb of Curb Agajanian Motorsports.  The two teams ended their partnership for 2007 with P. J. Jones competing for Team Leader Motorsports.

The team made a surprise entry into the 2007 XM Satellite Radio Indy 300 at Homestead-Miami Speedway and participated in it, the Kansas Speedway race and the Indy 500. Alex Barron drove in all 3 races and finished 15th in the Indy 500, 1 lap down.

The team made its 2008 debut at Twin Ring Motegi with Roger Yasukawa at the controls. Yasukawa also attempted to qualify the Curb Records car in the Indianapolis 500 as well but was bumped from the field.

In 2009, the team fielded a full-time IndyCar Series entry, beginning the season with NASCAR driver Stanton Barrett behind the wheel.  Barrett and sports marketer Steve Sudler both joined as partners of the team and the new name was CURB/Agajanian/3G Racing (3 Guys Racing). Jaques Lazier was brought on to replace Barrett at Texas Motor Speedway after the team went home after a practice crash the previous week at the Milwaukee Mile. Lazier drove the next three oval races and Richard Antinucci was brought in to drive the remaining road and street course races of the schedule. Barrett drove at Twin Ring Motegi, where he had sponsorship, and Lazier drove on all other remaining ovals.

For the 2010 Indianapolis 500, Curb Agajanian provided a co-entry for KV Racing Technology driver Mario Moraes. For the 2011 Indianapolis 500, Curb Agajanian provided a co-entry for Bryan Herta Autosport driver and Dan Wheldon who went on to win the race, CAPG's first Indy 500 win.

For the 2016 IndyCar Series, Curb Agajanian provided a co-entry for Andretti Herta Autosport driver Alexander Rossi. Alexander Rossi won the 2016 Indy 500 in this ride, the second Indy 500 win for CAPG. They remain listed a co-entrant in the car, now driven and co-owned by Marco Andretti.

Driver history

Curb-Agajanian
Tony Bettenhausen Jr. (1980)
Mike Chandler (1983)
Roger Mears (1980)

CURB/Agajanian/Beck
Alex Barron (2007)
Billy Boat (2001–2002)
P. J. Jones (2004)
Roger Yasukawa (2008)

Team Leader Motorsports
Stephan Gregoire (2006)
P. J. Jones (2006)

CURB/Agajanian/3G Racing
Richard Antinucci (2009)
Stanton Barrett (2009)
Jaques Lazier (2009)

USAC

2012
In 2012, Curb Agajanian became the first car owner to win all three USAC Championships in the same year (Silver Crown, Sprint Car and Midget).

2013
In 2013, Curb Agajanian again won all three USAC Championships in the same year (Silver Crown, Sprint Car and Midget).

Indy Racing League/IndyCar Results
(key) (Results in bold indicate pole position; results in italics indicate fastest lap)

See also
 Curb Racing – Curb's former NASCAR team, partly owned by Agajanian for 12 years.

References

External links

Mike Curb Racing
Mike Curb – NASCAR Owner

IndyCar Series teams
Auto racing teams established in 1984
American auto racing teams
Companies based in North Carolina
WeatherTech SportsCar Championship teams
NASCAR teams